The Abel Hyatt House is a historic house in rural Swain County, North Carolina. The two-story brick I-house was built in 1880 by Abel Hyatt, a farmer, and is the only known 19th-century masonry house in the county. It is a fine example of vernacular Greek Revival style.

The house was listed on the National Register of Historic Places in 1991.

See also
National Register of Historic Places listings in Swain County, North Carolina

References

Houses on the National Register of Historic Places in North Carolina
Greek Revival houses in North Carolina
Houses completed in 1880
Houses in Swain County, North Carolina
National Register of Historic Places in Swain County, North Carolina